Briscoe is a surname. Notable people with the surname include:

Anne Briscoe, American biochemist
Ben Briscoe, noted Irish politician and son of Robert Briscoe
Brent Briscoe (1961–2017), American actor and screenwriter
Chase Briscoe, American race car driver
Constance Briscoe, British barrister and author
Dezmon Briscoe, American football wide receiver
James Briscoe (1923–2014), Football (soccer) manager
Jay Briscoe (1984–2023), ring name of American professional wrestler Jamin "Jay" Pugh
Jill Briscoe, international speaker, author, magazine head and wife of Stuart Briscoe
John Briscoe, any of several people by that name
Lennie Briscoe, a character from the Law & Order television franchise
Lottie Briscoe, stage and silent film actress
Mark Briscoe (born 1985), ring name of American professional wrestler Mark Pugh
Marlin Briscoe (1945–2022), American football player
Nicole Briscoe, American sports reporter, former Miss Illinois Teen USA
Paul Briscoe (1930–2010), English school teacher and writer, known for spending much of his childhood in Nazi Germany
Robert Briscoe (disambiguation), any of several people by that name
Ryan Briscoe, Australian race car driver
Stuart Briscoe, evangelist, pastor, author and international speaker
Ted Briscoe, Australian rugby league footballer
Thomas Briscoe, Welsh priest and scholar
Tom Briscoe, English rugby league footballer